KFJZ is an AM radio station broadcasting in the Dallas/Fort Worth metroplex with a Financial News/Talk format via the BizTalkRadio. This station is licensed in Fort Worth, Texas and is owned and operated by SIGA Broadcasting Corporation. Because it shares the same frequency as "clear channel" station WWL in New Orleans, Louisiana, KFJZ operates only during the daytime hours. KFJZ is simulcast 24-hours a day on K273CS at 102.5 MHz.

KFJZ's Texas sister stations with SIGA Broadcasting include KTMR (1130 AM, Converse), KLVL (1480 AM, Pasadena), KGBC (1540 AM, Galveston), KAML (990 AM, Kenedy-Karnes City), and KHFX (1140 AM, Cleburne).

History
The station changed its call letters to KJIM in 1957, airing a beautiful music format inspired by Dallas's KIXL-AM-FM, which evolved into an MOR format in the early 1970s. In 1975 KJIM adopted a country music format.

In 1984, the station dropped the KJIM call letters and the country music format and began using the call letters KFJZ with a Standards music format. The call letters KFJZ had been used in Fort Worth for 40 years on the frequency of 1270 AM.

In 1986, KAAM has picked up their previous format so that KFJZ could switch to Spanish music and was branded Super Tejano 870. Two years later, AM 870 switched to a Catholic-religion format under the Spanish language. KFJZ filed for bankruptcy in 1994, but still remains on the air, only during daytime hours because it shares the same frequency as clear-channel station WWL in New Orleans, Louisiana.

In the Summer of 2008, Garden City Broadcasting sold this station to SIGA Broadcasting.

In year 2009, it changed formats and branding to Radio Salam Namaste (Indian Community Radio).

In the beginning of October 2016, KFJZ flipped formats to Financial News/Talk programming via the Biz Talk Radio network.

External links
FCC History Cards for KFJZ 

 DFW Radio/TV History
DFW Radio Archives

FJZ
News and talk radio stations in the United States
Business talk radio stations
Radio stations established in 1947
1947 establishments in Texas
FJZ
Business mass media in the United States